Karl-Heinz "Charly" Körbel (born 1 December 1954) is a German former professional football defender. He is currently a member of Eintracht Frankfurt's directors of football and runs their football academy.

Career

Playing career
Körbel is chiefly associated with spending his entire playing career at Eintracht Frankfurt from 1972 to 1991. He currently holds the record for most Bundesliga appearances at 602. He gained six caps for West Germany and played in ten B internationals.

Coaching career
Nowadays, Körbel manages the Eintracht Football Academy and runs a sport shop in his hometown Dossenheim.

Honours

Club
Eintracht Frankfurt
DFB-Pokal: 1973–74, 1974–75, 1980–81, 1987–88
UEFA Cup: 1979–80

References

External links 

 Karl-Heinz Körbel at eintracht-archiv.de 
 
 
 

1954 births
Living people
People from Rhein-Neckar-Kreis
Sportspeople from Karlsruhe (region)
German footballers
Germany international footballers
Germany B international footballers
Footballers from Baden-Württemberg
Association football defenders
Eintracht Frankfurt players
Eintracht Frankfurt managers
Eintracht Frankfurt non-playing staff
Bundesliga players
Bundesliga managers
VfB Lübeck managers
UEFA Cup winning players
FSV Zwickau managers
German football managers
West German footballers